Joanellia is an extinct genus of Carboniferous crustaceans. It contains the species Joanellia lundi from lagoons in what is now Montana, and Joanellia elegans from near-shore marine deposits in northern England and southern Scotland.

References

External links
 Joanellia at the Paleobiology Database

Prehistoric Malacostraca
Carboniferous crustaceans
Prehistoric crustacean genera
Carboniferous arthropods of North America
Prehistoric animals of Europe
Fossil taxa described in 1979